The Bairabi–Sairang line is a  long railway line from Bairabi to Sairang under the Northeast Frontier Railway zone of Indian Railways.

Details 

The cost of construction from Bairabi to Sairang is estimated at INR 2384 crores, which was later revised at INR 5021.45 crores. Bairabi-Sairang rail line entails 130 bridges, 23 tunnels and four stations namely Hortoki, Kawnpui, Mualkhang and Sairang, and  land was acquired for the construction.

Further extension

South spur to Kyauktau railhead to Sittwe in Myanmar 

 Zochachhuah (Zorinpui)-Sairang line: In August 2015, Indian Railways completed a survey for a new route extension from Sairang to Hmawngbuchhuah/Zorinpui on Mizoram's southern tip on India–Myanmar border, which will provide rail connectivity to Kaladan Multi-Modal Transit Transport Project (KMMTTP). In  August 2017, survey for this line was completed. 

 Zochachhuah (Zorinpui)-Kyaukhtu line: is 200 km planned railway line.

 Sittwe–Kyaukhtu line in Myanmar,  – exists and operational: This route has been operational since 2011.

East spur to Kalemyo railhead in Myanmar 

 Aizawl-Zokhawthar line future spur, from where it will then be extended to the existing railhead at Kalay (also called Kale and Kalemyo) in Myanmar to form part of the ambitious Trans-Asian Railway. 

 Imphal-Moreh line future spur which will be extended to the existing railhead at Kalay. 

 Kalemyo-Shwebo line, a new link connecting the existing railheads at Kalemyo and Shwebo for a shorter direct route to Mandalay and beyond.

Current status

 Aug 2019: 65% work was complete.

 Feb 2020: Railway Board Chairman inspected the 51.38 km long Bairabi-Sairang rail line project, which is nearing completion.

 Feb 2021: Due to the COVID-19 pandemic, which caused several delays in construction work, and due to lockdowns and lack of labour, the revised deadline of the rail line to Sairang, and the final extension till Mizoram's capital Aizawl, is likely to be completed by March 2023.

References

Proposed
Transport in Mizoram
Rail transport in Mizoram
2016 establishments in Mizoram
Transport in Aizawl